Suomen Robinson 2004, was the first season of the Finnish version of Expedition Robinson, or  Survivor as it is referred to in some countries and it premiered on 25 January 2004 and concluded on 2 May 2004. The show adapted many elements from the original Swedish version of the show such as the use of green and yellow for tribe colors, but instead of the typical North and South teams, there were the Sribuat and Sembilang tribes. During the early portion of the program the Sribuat tribe proved to be the stronger of the two as they won four of the six immunity challenges. When the two ribes merged into the Tengah tribe, the former members of quickly turned against each other as Heidi Moilanen, Ingmar Sirén, and Johanna Ullakko joined forces with Gun Sundqvist, Jarmo Hänninen, and Marjaana Valkeinen to form a powerful six person alliance. When it came time for the final four the contestants competed in a challenge in order to determine who would be the final two. Ultimately, it was Marjaana Valkeinen who won the season over Johanna Ullakko by a 5-3 jury vote to be crowned Robinson 2004 and win €40,000.

Finishing order

References

External links
http://koti.welho.com/tkuusio/srobinson/srobinson2004.htm

2004 Finnish television seasons
Survivor Finland seasons
Finnish reality television series
Television shows filmed in Malaysia